Anannya Literature Award is the prize for women in Bangladesh recognition of contribution to the field of literature by Anannya Magazine in every Bengali year since 1401 (Gregorian 1993).

Winners

References

Bangladeshi literary awards
Women in Bangladesh
Orders, decorations, and medals for women
Awards established in 1993
1993 establishments in Bangladesh